Dicrodontus is a genus of beetles in the family Carabidae, containing the following species:

 Dicrodontus alluaudi Mateu, 1952
 Dicrodontus aptinoides Wollaston, 1965
 Dicrodontus brunneus Dejean, 1831

References

Dryptinae